The Czech Cycling Tour is a multi-day road cycling race held annually in the Olomouc region in the Czech Republic. It was created in 2010 and was initially part of the UCI Europe Tour in category 2.2, but in 2015 moved up to 2.1. The race originally took place in July but the 2015 edition was held in the middle of August. The race was renamed to the Sazka Tour in 2021.

Winners

References

Cycle races in the Czech Republic
Recurring sporting events established in 2010
2010 establishments in the Czech Republic
UCI Europe Tour races